Richey McCourt is a Dublin-based songwriter, who is signed to Stockholm-based publishing company, DH MGMT. McCourt has worked with artists and producers including Will Young, Pixie Lott, Matt Cardle, Rebecca Ferguson and Isaac Waddington. He writes predominantly with Swedish-based writer and producer Nick Jarl. McCourt and Jarl's song "Losing the Love" is featured in the Disney movie Tini: El gran cambio de Violetta starring Martina Stoessel and on her debut album.

In June 2015, McCourt was interviewed as part of the IrishTimes.com series "How Music Works", where he discussed his approach to songwriting, and his background in performance.

McCourt has co-written a song for the Rebecca Ferguson album "Superwoman", called "I'll Meet You There". The album was released on October 14, 2016. In October 2017, a track written and produced by McCourt/Jarl "Not Alone" was released by Hollywood Records artist Shalisa.

Songwriting discography

References

Living people
Place of birth missing (living people)
Irish songwriters
1982 births